Catoire is a surname of French origin. Notable people with the surname include:

 Georgy Catoire (1861–1926), Russian composer of French heritage
 Jean Catoire (1923–2005), French composer

See also
 

Surnames of French origin